Beate Grimsrud (28 April 1963 – 1 July 2020) was a Norwegian novelist, short story writer, children's writer, scriptwriter and playwright.

Literary career
Grimsrud was born in Bærum, Norway and settled in Sweden. Among her books are Continental Heaven from 1993, Å smyge forbi en øks from 1998, and Søvnens lekkasje  from 2007. Her novel En dåre fri from 2010 was awarded the Norwegian Critics Prize for Literature. She wrote the script for the film Ballen i øyet from 2000. Her children's books include Klar ferdig gå! from 2007, Alba og Adam (2008), and Dinosaurene og de dansende trærne (2009).

She was awarded the Dobloug Prize in 2011.

Grimsrud died in Stockholm on 1 July 2020.

References

1963 births
2020 deaths
20th-century Norwegian novelists
21st-century Norwegian novelists
Norwegian women dramatists and playwrights
Norwegian women novelists
Norwegian screenwriters
21st-century Norwegian women writers
20th-century Norwegian women writers
20th-century Norwegian dramatists and playwrights
21st-century Norwegian dramatists and playwrights
Writers from Bærum
Norwegian women screenwriters